Northwestern University Libraries is the main academic library system of Northwestern University. The library holds 7.9 million items , including 228,505 maps, 107,446 print journals and 173,089 electronic journals, making it the 11th largest library at a private university. 

The building was designed in brutalist style by Walter Netsch of Skidmore, Owings & Merrill. Construction started in 1966 and the library opened in 1970. University Library succeeded Deering Library as the main library on campus and is connected to it. Along with the other institutions in the Committee on Institutional Cooperation, University Library joined the Google Book Search project on June 6, 2007.

Library Collections
Melville J. Herskovits Library of African Studies: established in 1954, and named after Melville J. Herskovits, the Herskovits Library is the largest separate Africana collection in existence. The collection includes more than 400,000 volumes (including 20,000 in African languages), 250 current newspapers and 6,000 non-circulating rare books.
The Music Library: contains extensive holdings of printed music and archival materials documenting music composed since 1945. The collection includes more than 300,000 items, including the John Cage collection. 
Transportation Library: one of the largest transportation information centers in the world with a collection of over 500,000 items covering air, rail, highway, pipeline, water, urban transport and logistics.
The Art Library: the Art Library holds over 160,000 books and journals about art, architecture, and design, with particular strength in 19th century art and architecture. 
Charles Deering McCormick Library of Special Collections
Northwestern University Archives
Pritzker Legal Research Center: the library is located on the Chicago campus and serves the Northwestern University Pritzker School of Law.
Seeley G. Mudd Library: Located on North Campus, Mudd Library was renovated in 2017 with collaboration and technology in mind.
Styberg Library: the theological library serves the Garrett–Evangelical Theological Seminary and Bexley Seabury.
Charles Deering Memorial Library: built in 1933, and named for Charles Deering, the library houses the art library, the Charles Deering McCormick Library of Special Collections, the Music Library and University Archives. 
Boas Mathematics Library: the library serves primarily the Mathematics Department and Statistics Department and has a research collection in pure mathematics and statistics of around 34,000 volumes.

Other Facilities
Oak Grove Library Center (OGLC): OGLC is a high-density shelving unit with a capacity of 3 million volumes, that serves Northwestern University Library, the Galter Health Sciences Library and Pritzker Legal Research Center. Most of the stored documents have electronic equivalents.

Other Initiatives
Northwestern University Library is a partner with the Native American Education Services College (NAES), the American Indian Association of Illinois, and Northwestern University’s Center for Native American and Indigenous Research in the NAES College Digital Library Project, which preserves the NAES College library and archives.

References

External links

Northwestern University  (NU) Libraries' Transportation Library
NU Libraries' Digital Collections

Library buildings completed in 1970
University and college academic libraries in the United States
Northwestern University campus
Brutalist architecture in Illinois
Libraries in Cook County, Illinois
1970 establishments in Illinois